The Latin Grammy Award for Best Salsa Album is an honor presented annually by the Latin Academy of Recording Arts & Sciences at the Latin Grammy Awards, a ceremony that recognizes excellence and promotes a wider awareness of cultural diversity and contributions of Latin recording artists in the United States and internationally. According to the category description guide for the 2012 Latin Grammy Awards, the award is for vocal or instrumental salsa albums containing at least 51 percent of newly recorded material. It is awarded to solo artists, duos or groups.

The accolade for Best Salsa Album was first presented to Cuban singer Celia Cruz at the 1st Latin Grammy Awards ceremony in 2000 for her album Celia Cruz and Friends: A Night of Salsa (1999). She also holds the record for the most wins in the category, with three. Gilberto Santa Rosa holds the record for most nominations, with nine. Puerto Rican artists have received this award more than any other nationality.

Winners and nominees

2000s

2010s

2020s

Notes 
 Each year is linked to the article about the Latin Grammy Awards held that year.
 The name of the performer and the nominated album

See also
Grammy Award for Best Salsa Album
Grammy Award for Best Salsa/Merengue Album

References 
General

Specific

External links
Official site of the Latin Grammy Awards

 
Awards established in 2000
Salsa Album